Bedgebury may refer to the following places in Kent, England:

Bedgebury Cross, hamlet in the civil parish of Goudhurst
Bedgebury Forest, forest surrounding Bedgebury National Pinetum
Bedgebury National Pinetum, recreational and conservational arboretum